Derrick Knowles (born 22 March 1966) is a Bahamian hurdler. He competed in the men's 110 metres hurdles at the 1988 Summer Olympics.

References

1966 births
Living people
Athletes (track and field) at the 1988 Summer Olympics
Bahamian male hurdlers
Olympic athletes of the Bahamas
Place of birth missing (living people)